NICOP may refer to:
National Identity Card for Overseas Pakistanis
Ninth International Conference on Permafrost